Takis Gonias (born 6 October 1971) is a Greek football manager and a former player.

Playing career

Club
Gonias began his career at local club Panathinaikos Kyriaki (not to be confused with Athens-based club Panathinaikos F.C.) at Kyriaki, Boeotia. He then moved to the region's most prestigious club Levadiakos, making his debut in the Greek Alpha Ethnki, the top-level football league in Greece. He then went on to play for a various top-level Greek clubs, including Olympiacos, Panionios and most successfully, Iraklis. After his good appearances with Iraklis, Gonias was transferred in 1998 to Sporting de Gijón in the Spanish Segunda Division. In 2004, he transferred to Italy and Serie A side Messina, where he played the last season of his career, despite making a transfer to Crotone in 2005.

International
Gonias has made two appearances and has scored one goal for the Greece national football team. He made his debut on 19 August 1997, managing to score with a penalty kick during a2–1 victory over Cyprus. He received his second and final cap six months later, coming in as a second-half substitute for Kostas Frantzeskos during another international friendly game.

Managerial career

Retirement and early career as manager 
After his retirement, Gonias worked as a football commentator for Greek television, while also professionally taking up Golf in Glyfada, Athens. However, he decided to return to professional football as a manager, starting his coaching career in 2013 at Glyfada and afterwards taking over management of Football League side Episkopi. In July 2016, Gonias was appointed manager of fellow 2nd tier club Kallithea, leading them for 8 games with a 2−0−6 record. After an unrealized deal with Gamma Ethniki side Volos NFC, Gonias was appointed manager of newly promoted Football League club Ergotelis in August 2017.

Ergotelis 
Gonias' unique approach to the game was met with suspicion from Greek media at first, even more so as the Cretans struggled to earn points on the Table and became relegation contenders at an early stage during the tournament. Despite criticism from local media, as well as a portion of the club's fans, who often demanded Gonias be sacked from his post, Ergotelis' board placed their full trust in their head coach' work. After an experimental First Round, Ergotelis' squad significantly improved and maintained an impressive good form, winning several key matches, scoring many goals, maintaining ball possession rates close to 60%-70% and eventually battling their way out of the relegation zone.

Wadi Degla 
Earning credit for Ergotelis' impressive improvement and acclaimed performances, Ergotelis' owner Maged Samy offered Gonias the head coach position at his Egyptian Premier League club Wadi Degla starting from 12 June 2018. On 11 February 2020, Gonias was dismissed from his duties at Wadi Degla.

Pyramids 
On 29 June 2021, he was hired by the Egyptian club Pyramids. However, he was dismissed after twelve matches in September of the same year. In April 2022, he was reappointed for a second tenure, then signed a new contract in September until 2025. On 5 January 2023, he was sacked from his position as head coach.

Tactics 

Gonias' teams place much emphasis on retaining possession of the ball and dictating play, often playing a high defensive line with the full backs pushing high up their respective sides. His teams are usually young, and rely heavily on passing and positional interchange to retain possession, a style of play reminiscent of the tiki-taka style of football. As a result, his teams often achieve possession percentages close to 60-70% throughout the game, but are also known to easily concede goals on the counterattack. His unwavering approach to the game regardless of the opponent and match progression, has often been openly questioned by the press and fans as inappropriate for the realities of the second tier of the Greek football league system. Gonias has therefore built a reputation in Greece for his post-match analysis during statements to the press, and his tendency to get overly defensive when questioned about his tactics.

Managerial statistics

References

1971 births
Living people
Footballers from Livadeia
Greek footballers
Greece international footballers
Levadiakos F.C. players
Olympiacos F.C. players
Iraklis Thessaloniki F.C. players
Sporting de Gijón players
Paniliakos F.C. players
Panionios F.C. players
A.C.R. Messina players
F.C. Crotone players
Greek expatriate footballers
Greek expatriate sportspeople in Spain
Greek expatriate sportspeople in Italy
Expatriate footballers in Italy
Expatriate footballers in Spain
Serie A players
Association football midfielders
Greek football managers
A.O. Glyfada F.C. managers
Episkopi F.C. managers
Kallithea F.C. managers
Ergotelis F.C. managers
Expatriate football managers in Egypt
Wadi Degla SC managers
Pyramids FC managers
Greek expatriate football managers